Bruun's cutthroat eel, Histiobranchus  bruuni, is a cutthroat eel of the genus Histiobranchus, found around New Zealand at the bottom of the deep ocean basin at depths of between 4,000  and 5,000 m.  Their length is between 40 and 60 cm.

References
 
 
 Tony Ayling & Geoffrey Cox, Collins Guide to the Sea Fishes of New Zealand,  (William Collins Publishers Ltd, Auckland, New Zealand 1982) 

Synaphobranchidae
Endemic marine fish of New Zealand
Fish described in 1964